The 1956 Xavier Musketeers football team was an American football team that represented Xavier University as an independent during the 1956 NCAA College Division football season. In its second season under head coach Harry W. Connelly, the team compiled a 7–3 record and outscored opponents by a total of 215 to 150. The team played its home games at Xavier Stadium in Cincinnati.

Schedule

References

Xavier
Xavier Musketeers football seasons
Xavier Musketeers football